Australia has over 5000 described species of fish, a quarter of which are endemic.  Seafood and aquaculture are major and highly regulated industries, and fishing for marine and freshwater native fish is popular.

Species of freshwater fish

For its land-size, Australia has a low diversity of native freshwater fish with only 281 described species.  This is largely because Australia is a very dry continent with sporadic rainfall and large areas of desert. There is a higher diversity of salt water fish.

The most common freshwater fish are:
Murray cod
Australian bass

Other species include:
 Australian grayling
 Australian smelt
 Climbing galaxias
 Common galaxias
 Eastern freshwater cod
 Eel-tailed catfish
 Estuary perch
 Flathead galaxias
 Golden perch
 Halfbeak/Garfish
 Jardini
 Inanga
 Macquarie perch
 Mary River cod
 Mountain galaxias
 Queensland lungfish
 Rainbowfish
 Retropinnidae
 River blackfish
 Saratoga
 Salamanderfish
 Short-finned eel
 Sleepy cod
 Trout cod
 Two-spined blackfish
 Western carp gudgeon

Marine fish
Abelites
Starry triggerfish
Abelites stellates
Anlaby's
Anlaby's taenianotus
Abilene's
Flat needlefish

References

 
Recreational fishing